Yun Junsang (born 20 November 1987) is a professional Go player.

Biography
Yun became a professional in 2001. He was promoted to 3 dan in 2004, 4 dan in 2005, and 5 dan in 2007 after winning the Guksu title. He is currently 9 dan. Yun broke a record in 2002 when he qualified for the first round of the 7th LG Cup. It was the shortest time between becoming a pro and entering an international tournament (3 months). In 2003, he just missed out on challenging Lee Chang-ho for the Kisung title when he lost to Cho Hunhyun in the challenger final, two games to one. In 2007, he won the Guksu title 3 to 1 over Lee Chang-ho.

Promotion record

Career record
2006: 61 wins, 27 losses
2007: 49 wins, 27 losses
2008: 32 wins, 26 losses
2009: 38 wins, 21 losses
2010: 46 wins, 21 losses
2011: 27 wins, 6 losses

Titles and runners-up

Korean Baduk League

References

External links
 Official Yun Junsang Profile from the Korean Go Association
 Yun Junsang profile in Igo Database 

1987 births
Living people
South Korean Go players
Hankuk University of Foreign Studies alumni